Broadford GAA is a Gaelic Athletic Association club located in the village of Broadford in East Clare, Ireland. The club fields teams exclusively in hurling competitions.

Major Honours
 Clare Intermediate Hurling Championship (8): 1941, 1947, 1974, 1981, 1997, 2003, 2008, 2019
 Clare Junior A Hurling Championship (3): 1939, 1955, 1958 (as Kilbane)

References

External links
 Broadford GAA Hurling and Camogie Clubs
 Broadford

Gaelic games clubs in County Clare
Hurling clubs in County Clare